The 1905 All-Ireland Senior Football Championship Final was the eighteenth All-Ireland Final and the deciding match of the 1905 All-Ireland Senior Football Championship, an inter-county Gaelic football tournament for the top teams in Ireland.

Kildare's seventeen players consisted of Clane players in the forwards and Roseberry players in the backs. Kildare led 0-6 to 0-1 at half-time and Jack Connolly's goal secured victory. For the first time, the telephone was used to relay news of victory back to the winning county.

References

Gaelic football
All-Ireland Senior Football Championship Finals
Kerry county football team matches
Kildare county football team matches